Kaii Liam Winkler (born 2006) is an American competitive swimmer. He is a world junior record holder in the long course 4×100-meter freestyle relay. At the 2022 Junior Pan Pacific Championships, he won gold medals in the 4×100-meter freestyle relay and 4×100-meter medley relay, as well as a silver medal in the 50-meter freestyle.

Background
Winkler is homeschooled for high school, competing scholastically as part of the South Florida Heat. He has an older brother, Finn, who is also a competitive swimmer.

Career

2021–2022
At his first Florida High School 1A State Championships in the autumn of 2021, Winkler placed second in the 100-yard freestyle with a time of 44.00 seconds and second in the 200-yard freestyle with a time of 1:36.78. In March the following year, he became the fastest American 15-year-old swimmer in history in the long course 100-meter freestyle with a time of 50.24 seconds at the 2022 Piranhas Senior Invitational in Florida. In April, at the 2022 USA Swimming International Team Trials held in Greensboro, North Carolina, he placed fourth in the c-final of the 100-meter freestyle with a time of 49.95 seconds and 33rd in the 200-meter freestyle with a 1:52.05. The next month, USA Swimming selected him to the 2022 Junior Pan Pacific Swimming Championships roster in the 100-meter freestyle based on his results at the International Team Trials.

2022 Junior Pan Pacific Championships

Day one of four at the 2022 Junior Pan Pacific Swimming Championships, held in August and contested at Veterans Memorial Aquatic Center in Honolulu, Winkler placed fourth in the b-final of the 200-meter freestyle with a time of 1:50.81 after swimming a personal best time of 1:50.07 in the preliminary heats. On the second day, he placed second in the b-final of the 100-meter freestyle with a 50.12, after swimming a personal best time of 49.47 seconds in the preliminary heats, and contributed a split of 1:51.27 for the fourth leg of the 4×200-meter freestyle relay to help win the exhibition heat with a time of 7:22.66.

In his first event of the evening session on day three, Winkler won the b-final of the 100-meter butterfly with a personal best time of 53.94 seconds. Later in the session, he split a 48.95 for the anchor, fourth, leg of the 4×100-meter freestyle relay in the final to help win the gold medal and set a new world junior record and Championships record of 3:15.79 with finals relay teammates Thomas Heilman, Henry McFadden, and Daniel Diehl. The following, and final, day, he tied fellow American Diggory Dillingham for the silver medal in the 50-meter freestyle with a personal best time of 22.50 seconds. In the 4×100-meter medley relay final, he and relay teammates Daniel Diehl (backstroke), Zhier Fan (breaststroke), and Thomas Heilman (butterfly), won the gold medal with a Championships record time of 3:36.65. He contributed a split time of 49.18 seconds for the freestyle leg of the relay.

2022 U.S. Open Championships
Leading up to the year's U.S. Open, Winkler competed at the 2022 Florida 1A High School State Championships in Stuart, Florida, where he won the 100-yard freestyle with a National Age Group record time of 42.52 seconds for the boys 15–16 age group on November 18, which was 0.15 seconds faster than the former record by Ryan Hoffer in 2014. He also won the state title in the 200-yard freestyle, in which he set a Florida high school record with a 1:34.18.

At the 2022 U.S. Open Swimming Championships, held in November and December in Greensboro, North Carolina, Winkler tied for nineteenth-place in the 50-meter freestyle on day two with a time of 22.97 seconds, which qualified him for the c-final. He lowered his time to a 22.82 in the evening to win the c-final. The following day, he swam a 1:50.97 in the preliminary heats of the 200-meter freestyle to qualify for the b-final ranking eleventh across all preliminary heats. Improving his time in the evening finals session, he won the b-final with a time of 1:50.26, which was 2.88 seconds slower than a-final winner Jake Mitchell. For his final event, the 100-meter freestyle on day four, he ranked seventh in the preliminary heats and qualified for the a-final with a time of 49.56 seconds. In the evening final, he achieved a sixth-place finish with a personal best time of 49.45 seconds.

2022 Winter Junior National Championships
Later in December, at the 2022 Winter Junior US National Championships, Winkler finished in a personal best time of 19.70 seconds in the 50-yard freestyle to place fourth at the East edition of the meet. The following day, he placed second in the 200-yard freestyle with a personal best time of 1:33.36. In the morning preliminaries on the fourth and final day, he swam a personal best time and new boys 15–16 National Age Group record of 42.21 seconds in the 100-yard freestyle to qualify for the final ranking first, his time broke the record he set in the event less than one month earlier at 42.52 seconds. He won the event in the evening with a time of 42.22, which was one-hundredth of a second slower than his time in the morning.

2023
At the second stop of the 2023 TYR Pro Swim Series in March in Fort Lauderdale, Florida, Winkler started competition on the second day with a national age group record for the boys 15–16 age group in the 100-meter freestyle, finishing in a time of 48.81 seconds in the preliminaries and qualifying for the final ranking third. In the evening he finished in 49.11 seconds to place fourth, 0.83 seconds behind gold medalist Dylan Carter. The following day, he placed second in the b-final of the 200-meter freestyle with a personal best time of 1:49.02. The fourth and final day, he placed sixth in the final of the 100-meter butterfly wth a personal best time of 52.64 seconds. For his final event, he won the b-final of the 50-meter freestyle in a personal best time of 22.49 seconds, finishing two-hundredths of a second ahead of the second-quickest b-final finisher Diogo Ribeiro of Portugal. Fifteen days later, he lowered his personal best time and national age group record in the 100-yard freestyle for the boys 15–16 age group to a time of 41.96 seconds at the 2023 Florida Gold Coast Swimming Championships.

International championships

 Winkler swam only in exhibition.

Personal best times

Long course meters (50 m pool)

Short course yards (25 yd pool)

World records

World junior records

Long course meters (50 m pool)

National age group records

Long course meters (50 m pool)

Legend: h – preliminary heat

Short course yards (25 yd pool)

Legend: h – preliminary heat

Awards and honors
 Florida Dairy Farmers, Mr. Swimming Award: 2022
 Miami Herald, Broward County Swimmer of the Year (boys): 2021–2022, 2022–2023
 Sun-Sentinel, Broward County Swimmer of the Year (boys): 2022
 Sun-Sentinel, Broward County Boys First Swimming Team: 2021

References

2006 births
Living people
Swimmers from Florida
American male freestyle swimmers